Loving Glances is a 2003 Serbian language romantic comedy directed by Srđan Karanović.

Cast
 Senad Alihodžić as Labud 
 Ivana Bolanča as Romana
 Jelena Đokić as Vida
 Milena Dravić as Vlasnica agencije
 Gorica Popović as Majka
 Boris Komnenić as Professor Jablan
 Matija Prskalo as Agnes
 Lotos Šparovec as Igor
 Branko Cvejić as  Otac
 Bisera Veletanlić as Ljubiteljka muzike
 Predrag Danilović as NBA kosarkas
 Mirjana Djurdjevic as Maskirna
 Andrew Greenwood as Michael
 Steve Agnew as Konzularni Sluzbenik
 Danijel Nikolic as Policajac
 Bojana Bambic as Ruskinja
 Goran Danicic as Gangster
 Marija Opsenica as Intelektualka
 Stevan Jovanovic as Odzacar
 Laza Jovanovic as Covek u vozu (as Lazar Jovanovic)
 Petar Cirica as Mladic iz parka
 Zoran Cvijanovic – Covek u kolima (uncredited)

Release
Loving Glances was released on 24 September 2003.

Awards
 Loving Glances was nominated for a Golden Lion at the 2003 Venice Film Festival.
 It was nominated for a Gold Hugo Award for 'Best Feature' at the Chicago International Film Festival in 2003.

References

External links

2003 films
2003 romantic comedy films
Serbian romantic comedy films
British romantic comedy films
2000s British films
2000s Serbian-language films